A cut bank is an outside bank of a river that is continually being undercut. It also may refer to:

 Cut Bank, Montana, county seat of Glacier County, Montana, United States
 Cut Bank station, the city's train station
 Cut Bank Municipal Airport, airport serving the city
 Cut Bank Air Force Station, closed United States Air Force radar station in Montana, United States
 Cut Bank Creek, tributary of the Marias River, northwestern Montana, United States
 Cut Bank Ranger Station Historic District, in Glacier National Park, United States
 Cut Bank Township, Bottineau County, North Dakota, civil township in the United States
 Cut Bank (film), 2014 American thriller directed by Matt Shakman

See also
 Cutbank (disambiguation)